Sir William Haswell Stephenson (1836-1918) was an English industrialist, Methodist and philanthropist, and mayor of Newcastle upon Tyne.

Personal life
Stephenson was born at Throckley, near Newcastle upon Tyne, on 15 May 1836. His family were Methodists and his ancestors had been involved in John Wesley's first establishment of Methodism in the north east of England in the 1740s. He was educated at Wesley College in Sheffield. He became a methodist local preacher in 1859, and was a supporter of the Local Preachers' Mutual Aid Association.

He married Eliza Mary Bond, from Lincolnshire, in 1862. She died in December 1901, aged 67. They had two daughters, Charlotte, who died before her father, and Kate.

Stephenson died on 7 May 1918.

Career, public office and philanthropy

Stephenson was involved in his family's business, the Throckley Coal Company, and later in other local businesses including John Spencer and sons, steel manufacturers, and Airedale Mills.

He was Mayor of Newcastle upon Tyne in 1875, 1884, and 1894; Lord Mayor in 1902, 1909, 1910, and 1911; and sheriff in 1886. In November 1902 he received the Lord Mayor (Sir Marcus Samuel) and Sheriffs of the City of London on an official visit to Newcastle.

Together with his wife he endowed several early public libraries in Newcastle. In 1896 the Stephenson Library at Elswick was the first branch library in the city, built at a cost of £4,000. It became West End Leisure and Learning in 1984, later a housing office, and then West End Woman and Girls Centre.  The Victoria Library in Heaton was opened in 1898; by 2001 it was no longer in use as a library and the council had proposed selling the building but after local objections it was agreed to use it as a centre for the local Muslim community. After his wife's death in 1901 Stephenson built the Lady Stephenson Library in Walker; opened in 1908 it was still in use as a library, also known as Walker Library, until it closed on 29 June 2013 and was refurbished in 2014 to form the premises of Cambridge Scholars Publishing.

In 1903 Stephenson gave the city a bronze statue of Queen Victoria by Alfred Gilbert, to commemorate 500 years of the office of Sheriff of Newcastle upon Tyne. It stands in St Nicholas Square, near Newcastle Cathedral in the city centre and is Grade II* listed.

Recognition

Stephenson was knighted on 30 June 1900 at Windsor Castle.

References

1836 births
1918 deaths
Mayors of Newcastle upon Tyne
English philanthropists
19th-century British philanthropists
People educated at Wesley College, Sheffield